Oxkutzcab Municipality (sometimes spelled as Oxcutzcab) is a municipality, with a municipal seat of the same name in the Mexican state of Yucatán, southeast of Maní, Yucatán, located at 
.  The name in the Yucatec Maya language means "Place of ramon, tobacco, and honey".

According to the 2005 census, Oxkutzcab had a population of 21,341 people in the city and 27,084 in the entire municipality, predominantly of Maya descent. Henequen, sugar, tobacco, maize, and fruit are grown commercially in the surrounding area.

Oxkutzcab was a town dating back to pre-Columbian times. With the fall of Mayapán in the 1440s, Oxkutzcab became a regional capital ruled by the Xiu family. After the Spanish conquest of Yucatán it was re-established as a Spanish colonial town in 1550; the Maya temples were demolished and a large Franciscan church built.

Oxkutzcab was granted the legal status of a city in the early 19th century. In 1847 the city was sacked in the Caste War of Yucatán.  In 1879 the city was linked to the capital of Mérida by railroad.

Each year during the last days of November, the city hosts a "Festival of Oranges". There are two markets of tropical fruits: the "20 de Noviembre" market and "Solidarity" market, better known as "La central".

Climate

References

External links
 Ayuntamiento de Oxkutzcab Possible future official website
 Oxkutzcab on Yucatan Today
 Oxkutzcab.com (in Spanish)
 Images and articles of Oxkutzcab including panoramic views (in Spanish)

Municipalities of Yucatán